"Give It Up" is a song by American hip hop group Public Enemy. It was released in July 1994 as the first single from their fifth album, Muse Sick-n-Hour Mess Age. It was their highest-peaking song on the US Billboard Hot 100, reaching number 33.

Track listing
 CD maxi
 "Give It Up" (Main) – 4:44	
 "Give It Up" (Instrumental) – 4:44	
 "Give It Up" (Dirty Drums In Memphis Mixx) – 5:17	
 "Live And Undrugged Pt. 2" – 2:36	
 "Bedlam 13:13" (Main) – 4:13	
 "Bedlam 13:13" (Instrumental) – 4:13	
 "Harry Allen's Interactive Super Highway Phone Call To Chuck D" – 2:53

Charts

References

1993 songs
1994 singles
Public Enemy (band) songs
Def Jam Recordings singles
Political rap songs
Songs written by Gary G-Wiz
Songs written by Chuck D
Songs written by Al Bell